Swanbourne railway station is a railway station on the Transperth network. It is located on the Fremantle line, 10.4 kilometres from Perth station serving the suburbs of Swanbourne, Claremont and Cottesloe.

History
Swanbourne station opened on 1 March 1904 as Congdon Street. It was renamed Osborne in 1912 (with 'West Claremont' also being considered at this time) before finally being renamed Swanbourne in 1921. The last change was at the request of the Commissioner of Railways to eliminate confusion with Osborne Park in the city's north-west.

The station closed on 1 September 1979 along with the rest of the Fremantle line, re-opening on 29 July 1983 when services were restored.

Services
Swanbourne station is served by Transperth Fremantle line services from Fremantle to Perth that continue through to Midland via the Midland line.

Swanbourne station saw 105,274 passengers in the 2013–14 financial year.

Platforms

Bus routes

References

Fremantle line
Railway stations in Perth, Western Australia
Railway stations in Australia opened in 1904
Swanbourne, Western Australia